The Mile-Long Bridge is the colloquial name for a  bridge in the northeastern part of the U.S. state of Illinois. The bridge carries Interstate 294 (I-294) over the Des Plaines River, the Chicago Ship and Sanitary Canal, two major railroad lines, and an intermodal facility. A series of 51 piers carries I-294 over the broad Des Plaines River valley.

In spite of its name, the bridge falls  short of one full mile in length.

History

Reconstruction (2019–2023)
As part of the Central Tri-State Tollway Project, construction of a new Mile-Long Bridge structure, together with demolition of the original 1958 structure, proceeded in phases commencing in 2019. In the first completed phase of the project, a new northbound bridge structure opened to traffic in November 2020.  Demolition of the old northbound structure commenced in 2021, followed by the construction of a new southbound structure.  The completed southbound structure opened to traffic in October 2022. Removal of the old southbound structure is expected to be complete in 2023.

References 

Road bridges in Illinois
Bridges on the Interstate Highway System
Interstate 294
Bridges completed in 1958
Toll bridges in Illinois
Steel bridges in the United States
Girder bridges in the United States
Transportation buildings and structures in Cook County, Illinois
Transportation buildings and structures in DuPage County, Illinois